Jeremias II Tranos (c. 1536 – 4 September 1595) was Ecumenical Patriarch of Constantinople three times between 1572 and 1595.

Life
Jeremias Tranos was born in Anchialos, from an influential Greek family. The exact date of birth is not known, most probably 1530, but some scholars suggest 1536. He studied with the best Greek teachers of his age, and in his youth he became a monk. Supported by the rich Michael Cantacuzene, he was appointed bishop of Larissa on about 1568.

When Cantacuzene obtained the deposition of Patriarch Metrophanes III, Jeremias, supported by Cantacuzene, was elected for the first time to the Patriarchate on 5 May 1572. Jeremias' first concern was the reform of his Church, and he summoned a synod with the aim to root out simony. He also restored his cathedral, that at the time was the Pammakaristos Church. During this his first reign Jeremias also had the first contacts with the Lutherans which ended in a deadlocked disagreement. On 3 March 1578 his patron, Cantacuzene was executed, and so Jeremias position became weak. On 23 (or 29) November 1579 Jeremias was deposed and excommunicated, and his rival Metrophanes III returned on the Patriarchal throne.

Metrophanes III died in August 1580, and Jeremias returned for the second time on the throne, probably on 13 August. From 1580 to 1583 there were contacts between Jeremias and envoys of the pope in regard to the introduction in Greece of the Gregorian calendar: Rome was almost sure about a positive solution, but on the contrary the final position of Jeremias was negative. In 1584 Jeremias offered as a gift to Pope Gregory XIII two pieces of relics from the bodies of Saint John Chrysostom and Saint Andrew of Crete.

In the winter between 1583 and 1584 Jeremias was subject of a conspiracy of some Greek bishops against him, led by Pachomius of Kaisaria and Theoleptus of Philippoupolis, that accused him to have supported a Greek uprise against the Ottoman Empire, to have baptized a muslim and to be in correspondence with the papacy. Jeremias was arrested and beaten, and three trials followed: the first charge resulted false, but the last resulted in his deposition on 22 February 1584 and in his exile in Rhodes.

Thanks to the intercession of the French ambassador, in 1586 Jeremias obtained the freedom from the exile in Rhodes and started his travel through the Polish–Lithuanian Commonwealth (which included also Ukraine) and the Tsardom of Russia to raise funds. During his travel, he arrived in Moscow on 11 July 1588, and after negotiations with Boris Godunov (the Regent for Tsar Feodor I of Russia) on 26 January 1589 Job of Moscow was enthroned as the first Patriarch of Moscow and All Russia. Patriarch Jeremias II recognized the Russian Orthodox Church. On his way back to Constantinople, Jeremias deposed the Metropolitan of Kiev , and in his place appointed and consecrated Michael Rohoza.

In the meantime, after 1584 Jeremias's deposition of two other patriarchs followed, Pachomius II and Theoleptus II, who was deposed in May 1586. The Church was governed by a supporter of Jeremias, deacon Nicephorus (died 1596), and for ten days by deacon Dionysius the Philosopher (later metropolitan of Larissa). In April 1587 Jeremias was formally re-elected as Patriarch, but due to his absence for his travel the Church went on being governed by the replacement cleric, deacon Nicephorus. On 4 July 1589 the Sultan formally appointed Jeremias as Patriarch of Constantinople (for the third time). Jeremias was informed to be again elected patriarch only in 1589 in Moldova when he was on the way back to Constantinople (now Istanbul) where he arrived in 1590.

On 12 February 1593 a synod in Constantinople sanctioned the Autocephaly of the Patriarchate of Moscow. The exact date of Jeremias' death is not known, but it occurred between September and December 1595, in Constantinople.

Greek Augsburg Confession
From 1576 to 1581 he conducted the first important theological exchanges between Orthodoxy and Protestants. On 24 May 1575, Lutherans Jakob Andreae and Martin Crusius from Tübingen presented the Patriarch with a translated copy of the Augsburg Confession. Jeremias II wrote three rebuttals known as 'Answers,' which established that the Eastern Orthodox Church had no desire for reformation. The Lutherans replied to the first two letters, but the third letter ended in a deadlocked disagreement between the parties. The significance of the exchanges were that they presented, for the first time in a precise and clear way, where the Orthodox and Reformation churches stood in relation to each other.

References

Further reading

External links
Tibbs - Patriarch Jeremias II, the Tübingen Lutherans, and the Greek Version of the Augsburg Confession
Schaff - The Answers of Patriarch Jeremiah to the Lutherans, A.D. 1576

|-

|-

16th-century Lutheranism
1530s births
1595 deaths
Eastern Orthodox theologians
Pomorie
People from Pomorie
Bishops of Larissa
16th-century Ecumenical Patriarchs of Constantinople